Spinaeschna tripunctata is a species of dragonfly in the family Telephlebiidae,
known as the southern cascade darner. 
It is a medium to large, dark brown dragonfly with greenish-yellow markings.
It is endemic to eastern Australia, occurring in New South Wales and Victoria, where it inhabits streams and rivers.

Gallery

See also
 List of Odonata species of Australia

References

Telephlebiidae
Odonata of Australia
Endemic fauna of Australia
Taxa named by René Martin
Insects described in 1901